CFR Title 16 – Commercial Practices is one of fifty titles comprising the United States Code of Federal Regulations (CFR), containing the principal set of rules and regulations issued by federal agencies regarding commercial practices. It is available in digital and printed form, and can be referenced online using the Electronic Code of Federal Regulations (e-CFR).

Structure 

The table of contents, as reflected is as follows:

References

 16